Paramatti is a surname. Notable people with the surname include:

Lorenzo Paramatti (born 1995), Italian footballer
Michele Paramatti (born 1968), Italian footballer, father of Lorenzo

See also
Paramatta (disambiguation)

Italian-language surnames